Raúl Mariano Pino Terán (17 October 1925 – 30 July 2002) was a Chilean football manager who worked in Chile and Bolivia.

Career
As a football player, he was a product of Universidad de Chile youth system, and left football at the age of 19 due to a serious achilles tendon injury. Then, he had an extensive career as manager in his country of birth and Bolivia.

In Chile
As a football coach, he began working as an assistant in Universidad de Chile. In the Segunda División he coached Green Cross, winning the 1963 league, Trasandino and Coquimbo Unido. In the Chilean Primera División he coached Magallanes, Unión La Calera, Everton, Naval and Regional Antofagasta

In Bolivia
Pino came to Bolivia to coach Jorge Wilstermann in 1975. He also coached Blooming, Oriente Petrolero, Destroyers, Always Ready, San José, Real Santa Cruz, winning the 1993 Copa Simón Bolívar, and Universidad Cruceña.

He won the Bolivian Primera División three times: with Jorge Wilstermann in 1980 and 1981 and with Blooming in 1984.

National team
Pino led the Chile national amateur team in the 1963 Pan American Games.

In 1972, he went on in charge without Vera, coaching Chile in four friendly matches.

In 1985, he assumed as coach of the Bolivia national team for two months, leading the team in 6 matches, including the 1986 FIFA World Cup qualifiers.

Personal life
He had two children, Lorena and Iván, along with his wife Aurora.

He was nicknamed El Mago (The Magician), due to the fact that he had notable achievements.

In July 2002, before he died, both the Bolivian Football Federation and the Bolivian Football Managers Association made a ceremony in honor of Pino and his career.

Honours
Green Cross
 Segunda División de Chile (1): 1963

Jorge Wilstermann
  (2): 1975, 1976
 Primera División de Bolivia (2): , 

Blooming
 Primera División de Bolivia (2): 

Real Santa Cruz
 Copa Simón Bolívar (1): 1993

Chile (along with Luis Vera)
  (1): 
  (1):

References

External links
 
 Raúl Pino at PartidosdeLaRoja.com 

1925 births
2002 deaths
People from Curicó
Chilean footballers
Universidad de Chile footballers
Chilean Primera División players
Chilean football managers
Chilean expatriate football managers
Green Cross managers
Trasandino de Los Andes managers
Magallanes managers
Unión La Calera managers
Coquimbo Unido managers
Everton de Viña del Mar managers
Chile national football team managers
Deportes Naval managers
Deportes Antofagasta managers
C.D. Jorge Wilstermann managers
Club Blooming managers
Bolivia national football team managers
Oriente Petrolero managers
Club Destroyers managers
Club Always Ready managers
Club San José managers
Real Santa Cruz managers
Primera B de Chile managers
Chilean Primera División managers
Bolivian Primera División managers
Chilean expatriate sportspeople in Bolivia
Expatriate football managers in Bolivia